Summerstown may refer to:
Summerstown, Buckinghamshire, England
Summerstown, London, England
Summerstown, Ontario, Canada

See also 
Somerstown, Hampshire, England
Somers Town (disambiguation)
Summertown (disambiguation)